Barrington Gerard Hole (16 September 1942 – 25 March 2019) was a Welsh professional footballer who played as a midfielder. A Wales international, he began his career with Cardiff City and made his professional debut as a teenager.

Career

Hole's father Billy had been a professional footballer and played for Swansea Town before World War II, making over 400 appearances and playing in the club's first ever fixture in The Football League. His older brothers Colin and Alan had also both played for their hometown club Swansea, although Colin never made a first team appearance.
Barrie did not initially follow the family tradition and instead joined their rivals Cardiff City. He made his league debut as a seventeen-year-old during a 4–3 victory over Luton Town in February 1960 during a season when Cardiff gained promotion to the first division.
Soon establishing himself in the Bluebirds side, even playing as an emergency striker on occasions, he was a vital member of the side, including being ever present during the 1964–65 season. During his time at Ninian Park, Hole made his debut for the Welsh national team in 1963 in a British Home Championship game against Northern Ireland which Wales won 4–1. Hole had become a regular for the national team when he was signed by Blackburn Rovers in July 1966 for £40,000. After just two years at Blackburn he moved, this time to Aston Villa for £60,000 in September 1968. In 1969, Hole won the Aston Villa Lions Club Terrace Trophy for the best player at Aston Villa as decided by the fans. In May 1970, Hole was signed to Swansea City by then manager Roy Bentley for £20,000. It was during his time here that Hole played his last match for Wales, a Euros qualifier against Romania which was a 0–0 draw. Hole played for Swansea for two years before fully retiring from football in May 1972.

After retiring from football he ran a newsagents in Swansea before selling it in 2004.

Barrie died in March 2019 aged 76.

References

1942 births
2019 deaths
Footballers from Swansea
Welsh footballers
Wales international footballers
Wales under-23 international footballers
Cardiff City F.C. players
Blackburn Rovers F.C. players
Aston Villa F.C. players
Swansea City A.F.C. players
English Football League players
Association football midfielders